Lorenzo Farinelli (born 10 August 1987) is a former Italian professional footballer who played as a goalkeeper in the fourth tier of football in Italy.

Club career
Born in Todi, the Province of Perugia, Farinelli started his career at Perugia. After the club was expelled from professional league in 2005, he was signed by Triestina. In July 2009 he left for Sangiustese.

In summer 2010 he retired from professional football and played for Eccellenza Umbria team San Marco Juventina, which located in San Marco frazione, Perugia.

International career
He was the third keeper at 2006 UEFA European Under-19 Football Championship qualification, behind Andrea Consigli and Giacomo Bindi. Despite the team failed to qualify to the elite round in October, he played for the team as overage player in the friendlies from December 2005 to May 2006, which FIGC organised difference friendly for U-19 and Italy U-20 team but both team composited with players born 1987 (but also consist of other age group). He substituted Salvatore Sirigu and Consigli (twice) respectively.

References

External links
 FIGC 
 San Marco Juventina Profile 
 Football.it Profile 

Italian footballers
A.C. Perugia Calcio players
U.S. Triestina Calcio 1918 players
U.S. Vibonese Calcio players
Association football goalkeepers
People from Todi
1987 births
Living people
Footballers from Umbria
Sportspeople from the Province of Perugia
A.C. Sangiustese players